Zanda may refer to:

 Zanda (bird), a genus of three species of black cockatoo
 Zanda County, county in Tibet
 Zanda, Tibet, seat of Zanda County
 Zanda (given name)
 Princess Zanda, a fictional Marvel Comics character
 "Zanda", a song by Russian composer 
"Countess Zanda", character from the movie Sheena (film)